John Devries (born March 20, 1945) is a former political figure in the Yukon, Canada. He represented Watson Lake in the Yukon Legislative Assembly from 1989 to 1996 as a member of the Yukon Party.

He was born in the Netherlands, the son of Wiebe Devries and Geeskje Lenos, came to Canada with his parents in 1947 and was educated in Ontario. In 1976, he married Henriette Gwendyke Dryer. He served in the Yukon cabinet as Minister of Economic Development, Mines, Small Business and Minister of Government Services from 1992 to 1994. Devries was Speaker for the assembly from 1994 to 1996. Before entering politics, he was a mechanic, taxidermist and guide. He was defeated by Dennis Fentie when he ran for reelection in 1996.

References 

Living people
1945 births
Yukon Party MLAs
Speakers of the Yukon Legislative Assembly